The 2021 Korean Curling Championships (branded as the 2021 KB Financial Korean Curling Championships), Korea's national curling championships, were held from June 23 to July 3 at the Gangneung Curling Centre in Gangneung, South Korea. The winning teams on both the men's and women's sides became the Korean National Teams for the 2021–22 curling season. They represented Korea at the 2021 Pacific-Asia Curling Championships, 2022 World Women's Curling Championship, 2022 World Men's Curling Championship and the Olympic Qualification Event in attempts to reach the 2022 Winter Olympics in Beijing, China. The championship was held in two rounds.

Summary

Women
On the women's side, Team Kim Eun-jung, representing Gangneung City Hall, defended their national title from the 2020–21 season by winning both the first and second rounds. In Round 1, Teams Kim Eun-jung and Kim Min-ji, representing Chuncheon City Hall, both posted 4–0 records through the round robin and Teams Gim Un-chi (Gyeonggi Provincial Office) and Kim Ji-su (Songhyeon High School A) went 3–1. Eun-jung then defeated Ji-su 5–3 in one semifinal and Gim Un-chi topped Kim Min-ji 8–6 in the other. Gangneung City Hall then defeated Gyeonggi Provincial Office 11–6 in the final. In Round 2, Kim Eun-jung and her team topped the double round robin with a 5–1 record which secured their place as the national champions. Team Kim Min-ji, who finished 4–2 and Team Gim Un-chi, who finished 3–3, played a second place game to determine the national team backup, which Min-ji won 6–4.

Team Kim Eun-jung, consisting of Eun-jung, third Kim Kyeong-ae, second Kim Cho-hi, lead Kim Seon-yeong, alternate Kim Yeong-mi and coaches Peter Gallant and Lim Myung-sup won the national championship during the 2020–21 season and represented South Korea at the 2021 World Women's Curling Championship. There, the team finished with a 7–6 record, tied for fifth place. However, due to their loses against Teams Canada and the United States, they placed seventh after the round robin, missing the playoffs and direct qualification for South Korea for the 2022 Winter Olympics. This meant the team had to play in the Olympic Qualification Event in December 2021 to qualify for the Olympics, which they won the silver medal at in 2018. At the qualification tournament, Team Kim finished third and secured the final women's berth to the Beijing Olympics.

Men
The men's championship also finished in two rounds with Team Kim Soo-hyuk, representing the Gyeongbuk Athletic Association, winning both the first and second rounds. In Round 1, Team Kim Soo-hyuk and defending champions Team Jeong Yeong-seok, representing the Gyeonggi-do Curling Federation, both went undefeated through the round robin and Teams Lee Ki-jeong (Gangwon-do Office) and Lee Jeong-jae (Seoul City Hall) both had one loss. The Gyeongbuk Athletic Association then topped Seoul City Hall 8–3 in one semifinal and the Gyeonggi-do Curling Federation beat Gangwon-do Office in the other. Kim Soo-hyuk then won the round by scoring three in an extra end to defeat Jeong Yeong-seok 10–7. In Round 2, Teams Kim Soo-hyuk and Lee Ki-jeong finished tied with 4–2 records after the round robin with Lee Jeong-jae at 3–3 and Jeong Yeong-seok at 1–5. Soo-hyuk and Ki-jeong then played a final to determine the winner of Round 2, which Soo-hyuk won 6–5 in an extra end.

After Team Jeong Yeong-seok won the 2020 Korean Curling Championships, they earned the right to represent South Korea at the 2021 World Men's Curling Championship. There, they finished with a 2–11 record. Like the women's team, Team Kim Soo-hyuk, consisting of Soo-hyuk, third Kim Chang-min, second Jeon Jae-ik, lead Kim Hak-kyun and coach Yoon So-min had to finish in the top three at the Olympic Qualification Event to qualify for the 2022 Olympics. Unfortunately, the team finished with a 2–6 record at the qualification tournament, failing to advance to the Games.

Medalists

Format
The Korean Curling Championships are held every year to determine the teams that will compete at the Pacific-Asia Curling Championships in hopes of reaching the World Curling Championships. Every four years, the winner of the championship also goes onto represent South Korea at the Olympic Games. In order to determine the Olympic Teams, the championship is held in three rounds to ensure the best team wins. The first round is open to all teams and the second round is open to the top four placing teams from the first round. If one team wins both the first and second rounds, then no third round is needed. The third and final round is a best-of-seven series between the winners of rounds one and two to determine the national champion and Olympic representative.

Teams

Men
The men's teams are listed as follows:

Women
The women's teams are listed as follows:

Round 1
The first round of the championship was held from June 23 to 28. The top two teams in each pool advanced to the playoffs and the second round.

Men

Round-robin standings
Final round-robin standings

Round-robin results
All draw times are listed in Korean Standard Time (UTC+09:00).

Draw 1
Wednesday, June 23, 9:00 am

Draw 3
Wednesday, June 23, 7:00 pm

Draw 5
Thursday, June 24, 2:00 pm

Draw 7
Friday, June 25, 9:00 am

Draw 9
Friday, June 25, 7:00 pm

Draw 10
Saturday, June 26, 9:00 am

Draw 12
Saturday, June 26, 7:00 pm

Playoffs

Semifinals
Sunday, June 27, 7:00 pm

Third place game
Monday, June 28, 11:00 am

Final
Monday, June 28, 6:00 pm

Women

Round-robin standings
Final round-robin standings

Round-robin results
All draw times are listed in Korean Standard Time (UTC+09:00).

Draw 2
Wednesday, June 23, 2:00 pm

Draw 4
Thursday, June 24, 9:00 am

Draw 6
Thursday, June 24, 7:00 pm

Draw 8
Friday, June 25, 2:00 pm

Draw 11
Saturday, June 26, 2:00 pm

Playoffs

Semifinals
Sunday, June 27, 2:00 pm

Third place game
Monday, June 28, 11:00 am

Final
Monday, June 28, 9:00 pm

Round 2
The second round of the championship was held from June 30 to July 3. As Round 1 champions Kim Soo-hyuk and Kim Eun-jung won the round, no third round was needed.

Men

Round-robin standings
Final round-robin standings

{|
|valign=top width=10%|

Round-robin results
All draw times are listed in Korean Standard Time (UTC+09:00).

Draw 1
Wednesday, June 30, 10:00 am

Draw 2
Wednesday, June 30, 7:00 pm

Draw 3
Thursday, July 1, 10:00 am

Draw 4
Thursday, July 1, 7:00 pm

Draw 5
Friday, July 2, 10:00 am

Draw 6
Friday, July 2, 7:00 pm

Playoffs

Final
Saturday, July 3, 10:00 am

Women

Round-robin standings
Final round-robin standings

{|
|valign=top width=10%|

Round-robin results
All draw times are listed in Korean Standard Time (UTC+09:00).

Draw 1
Wednesday, June 30, 10:00 am

Draw 2
Wednesday, June 30, 7:00 pm

Draw 3
Thursday, July 1, 10:00 am

Draw 4
Thursday, July 1, 7:00 pm

Draw 5
Friday, July 2, 10:00 am

Draw 6
Friday, July 2, 7:00 pm

Playoffs

Second place game
Saturday, July 3, 2:00 pm

See also
2021 Korean Mixed Doubles Curling Championship

References

External links
Korean Curling Media (@curling1spoon) on Instagram
Men's event
Women's event

2021 in curling
Curling at the 2022 Winter Olympics
Sports competitions in Gangneung
June 2021 sports events in South Korea
2021 in South Korean sport